Bukov may refer to:

People
Boris Bukov (born 1935), Soviet spy
Emilian Bukov (1909–1984), Soviet Moldavian writer and poet

Places in the Czech Republic
Bukov (Žďár nad Sázavou District), a municipality and village
Bukov, a village and part of Hořovičky
Bukov, an administrative part of Ústí nad Labem